Chalcopteryx is a genus of damselflies in the family Polythoridae. There are about five described species in Chalcopteryx.

Species
These five species belong to the genus Chalcopteryx:
 Chalcopteryx machadoi Costa, 2005 c g
 Chalcopteryx radians Ris, 1914 i c g
 Chalcopteryx rutilans (Rambur, 1842) i c g
 Chalcopteryx scintillans McLachlan, 1870 i c g
 Chalcopteryx seabrai Santos and Machado, 1961 i c g
Data sources: i = ITIS, c = Catalogue of Life, g = GBIF, b = Bugguide.net

References

Further reading

 
 
 
 
 
 
 

Damselflies